Thanga Gopuram is a 1971 Indian Tamil-language film produced, written and directed by M. S. Solaimalai. It stars Jaishankar and Jayalalithaa, with Sundarrajan, V. K. Ramasamy, M. R. R. Vasu, Srikanth, Vennira Aadai Nirmala, Srividya and Manorama in supporting roles. The film was released on 12 August 1971.

Plot

Cast 
 Jaishankar as Durai
 Jayalalithaa as Seetha
 Sundarrajan as Sadha Sivam
V. K. Ramasamy as Boothalingam
M. R. R. Vasu as Nithiyantham
 Srikanth as Raja
Krishna Rao as Mannaru
Pakoda Kadhar as Alwar
Karikol Raju as Mahalinga Pillai
 Vennira Aadai Nirmala as Malathi
Srividya as Shanthi
 Manorama as Kamala
 Seethalakshmi as Boothalingam's wife

Production 
Jaishankar, who played Jayalalithaa's lover in several films, portrayed her brother for the second time after Gowri Kalyanam (1966).

Soundtrack 
The music was composed by S. M. Subbaiah Naidu, while the lyrics were written by Kannadasan, "Kavi" Rajagopal and Ra. Pazhanisamy.

Reception 
The film was critically acclaimed and commercially successful. In this film Jayalalithaa, also appears as the actress Jayalalithaa for a song in the film, both character reflects on her stardom as well as anticipates her transformation into a meta-object, and was regarded as classic film for her. She won the Tamil Nadu State Film Award for Best Actress.

References

External links 
 

1970s Tamil-language films
1971 films
Films scored by M. S. Viswanathan